Raoul Auger (or Anger) Feuillet (c.1660–1710) was a French dance notator, publisher and choreographer most well-known today for his Chorégraphie, ou l'art de décrire la danse (Paris, 1700) which described Beauchamp–Feuillet notation, and his subsequent collections of ballroom and theatrical dances, which included his own choreographies as well as those of Pécour.

His Chorégraphie (1700) was translated into English by John Weaver (as Orchesography. Or the Art of Dancing) (1706) and P. Siris (as The Art of Dancing), both published in 1706. Weaver also translated the Traité de la cadance from Feuillet's 1704 Recŭeil de dances (as A Small Treatise of Time and Cadence in Dancing, 1706).  Feuillet's Recŭeil de contredances (1706), a collection of English country dances, was translated into English by John Essex (as For the Furthur Improvement of Dancing, 1710).

References

External links 
 
 
 The books of John Weaver Facsimiles and transcriptions of Weaver's translations: Orchesography (1st edition) and A Small Treatise of Time and Cadence in Dancing.
 The Library of Congress' An American Ballroom Companion includes several works by Feuillet:
 Chorégraphie, ou L'art de décrire la dance (1713 edition)
 Orchesography (2nd ed., undated) translated by Weaver
 Recueil de dances, composées par Mr. Feuillet (1700/1709)
 Recueil de dances, composées par M. Pecour (1700/1709)
 Per. receŭil de danses de bal pour l'année 1703
 Recŭeil de dances contenant un tres grand nombres, des meillieures entrées de ballet de Mr. Pecour (1704)
 Recŭeil de contredances (1706)
 For the Furthur Improvement of Dancing (1710) translated by Essex
 Direct access to Feuillet dances accessible via a table of content

French choreographers
Dance notators
1650s births
1700s deaths